The Dakota-Iowa Athletic Conference was a short-lived intercollegiate athletic conference that existed from 1946 to 1949. The league had members in Iowa and South Dakota.

Champions
 1946 – Westmar and 
 1947 –  and 
 1948 –

See also
List of defunct college football conferences

References

 
College sports in Iowa
College sports in South Dakota
Sports leagues established in 1946
Sports leagues disestablished in 1949